The fountain of the Esedra is the largest fountain in Naples, Italy, in the vast architectural complex of the Mostra d'Oltremare.

History 
The fountain was designed in 1938 by two architects, Carlo Cocchia and Luigi Piccinato, and inaugurated in 1940. It was commissioned by the fascist regime, as it was to celebrate the Italian colonial policy. The inauguration was spectacular: the symphony "Fontane d'Oltremare" (composed by Guido Pannain) was performed and the water jets were synchronized with the music.

On May 23, 2006, after about thirty years of almost total abandonment and two and a half years of work that cost about six million euros, the fountain was restored and inaugurated again.

Features 
Around it is surrounded by eight hundred tall trees, especially pines and holm oaks. Currently the fountain counts 76 exedra basins, 1300 nozzles made of brass and bronze, twelve cascading fountains and as many electric pumps. Thanks to about 800 projectors that emit lights of various colors and an audio system, the fountain is able to offer very suggestive shows. The decoration of the fountain, made in ceramic, is the work of Giuseppe Macedonio.

Gallery

References 

Fountains in Naples